Lars Broström (26 July 1931 — 4 August 2013) was a Swedish footballer. He made 110 Allsvenskan appearances for Djurgårdens IF.

Broström also played bandy for Djurgårdens IF.

Honours

Club 
 Djurgårdens IF 
 Division 2 Svealand (1): 1961
 Allsvenskan: 1959

References

Swedish footballers
Sweden international footballers
Swedish bandy players
Association football defenders
Allsvenskan players
IFK Stockholm players
Värtans IK players
Djurgårdens IF Fotboll players
Djurgårdens IF Bandy players
1931 births
2013 deaths